Belmonte is a municipality (município) in the Brazilian state of Bahia. It is located at 15º51'47" S, 38º52'58" W. It is 8 metres above sea level. In 2020 it had an estimated population of 23,437 inhabitants. 

The municipality covers a total area of 2016.85 km² and was founded in 1764.

The municipality contains part of the  Canavieiras Extractive Reserve, created in 2006.

References

Populated coastal places in Bahia
1764 establishments in the Portuguese Empire
Municipalities in Bahia